Lawrence Gilbert "Larry" Gagosian (born April 19, 1945) is an American art dealer who owns the Gagosian Gallery chain of art galleries. Working in concert with collectors including Douglas S. Cramer, Eli Broad, and Keith Barish, he developed a reputation for staging museum-quality exhibitions of contemporary art.

Early life and education
Gagosian was born April 19, 1945, in Los Angeles, California, the elder sibling and only son to Armenian parents. His mother, Ann Louise, had a career in acting and singing, and his father, Ara, was an accountant and later a stockbroker. His grandparents (original last name Ghoughasian) immigrated from Armenia; he and his parents were born in California. Between 1963 and 1969, he pursued a major in English literature at UCLA and graduated in 1969.

He worked briefly in a record store, a bookstore, a supermarket, and in an entry-level job as Michael Ovitz’s secretary at the William Morris Agency, but got his start in the art business by selling posters near the campus of UCLA in Los Angeles. He closed his poster shop around 1976, when a former restaurant facility became available in the same complex on Westwood's Broxton Avenue, and upgraded to prints by artists like Diane Arbus and Lee Friedlander. His gallery Prints on Broxton was renamed the Broxton Gallery when he began to show a wider array of contemporary art. The gallery worked with up-and-coming artists such as Vija Celmins, Alexis Smith, and Elyn Zimmerman, and staged exhibitions such as "Broxton Sequences: Sequential Imagery in Photography", which included the work of John Baldessari and Bruce Nauman.

Television executive Barry Lowen introduced Gagosian to Douglas S. Cramer, who introduced him to his ex-wife, Joyce Haber, who sold him her California art, which he promptly and profitably resold.

Career 

In 1978, he opened his first gallery, on La Brea Avenue in West Hollywood, and began showing young Californians (Vija Celmins, Chris Burden) and new New Yorkers (Eric Fischl, Cindy Sherman, Jean-Michel Basquiat). That same year, he bought a loft in New York on West Broadway opposite the Leo Castelli Gallery. It was Castelli who introduced Gagosian to Charles Saatchi and Samuel Newhouse Jr. In his first New York appearance, in 1979, he presented David Salle's first exhibition in a loft at 421 West Broadway, in collaboration with dealer Annina Nosei. In 1982, Nosei and Gagosian staged an exhibition of Jean-Michel Basquiat in Los Angeles. Around that time, Basquiat worked from the ground-floor display and studio space Gagosian had built below his Venice home on Market Street.

In the early 1980s, Gagosian developed his business rapidly by exploiting the possibilities of reselling works of art by blue-chip modern and contemporary artists, earning the nickname "Go-Go" in the process. After establishing a Manhattan gallery in the mid-1980s, located at the ground-floor space in artist Sandro Chia’s studio building at 521 West 23rd Street, Gagosian began to work with a stable of super collectors including David Geffen, Newhouse, Saatchi, and David Ganek. Bidding on behalf of Newhouse in 1988, Gagosian paid over $17 million for False Start (1959) by Jasper Johns, a then-record price for a work by a living artist. That record was beaten in 2008, when Gagosian paid $23.5 million at Sotheby's in November 2007 for Jeff Koons's Hanging Heart (an artist who happens to belong to the Gagosian gallery's stable).

In 1988, Gagosian bought the Toad Hall estate in Amagansett, New York, with an 11,000-square-foot house designed by architect Charles Gwathmey for fellow architect François de Menil in 1983, for $8 million. In 2009, he had Christian Liaigre design a home for him in Flamands Beach on St. Barths. In 2010, internet pioneer David Bohnett sold his 5,700 square foot Holmby Hills compound, originally designed by A. Quincy Jones for Gary Cooper, to Gagosian for $15.5 million, according to public records. Gagosian bought the former Harkness Mansion, an enormous townhouse at 4 East 75th Street in Manhattan, for $36.5 million<ref>Jennifer Gould Keil (August 17, 2011), Art of the Deal New York Post'.</ref> in 2011.

On 10 May 2022, Gagosian bought one of the four Shot Marilyns paintings by Andy Warhol, for a record breaking $195 million, making it the most expensive piece of 20th century art to change hands in a public sale.

Recognition
In 2011, the British magazine ArtReview placed Gagosian fourth in their annual poll of "most powerful person in the art world".

Legal issues

In 2003, Gagosian paid $4 million settlement after federal prosecutors accused him and three partners of failing to pay taxes on the sale of 58 works of art.

In 2012, suits and counter-suits were filed by Gagosian and Ronald Perelman against one another concerning an unfinished work by Jeff Koons and 10 others worth up to $45 million.

In 2012, Gagosian was sued for $14 million in a suit involving the sale of an edition of Girl in Mirror''.

Membership 

Jazz at Lincoln Center, Member of the Board of Directors (since 2012)
Museum Berggruen, Member of the International Council
New York University Institute of Fine Arts, Member of the Board of Trustees

References

External links
Gagosian Gallery

1945 births
People from Los Angeles
American people of Armenian descent
Armenian American art collectors
American art collectors
American art dealers
Living people
University of California, Los Angeles alumni
People from Amagansett, New York
People from Holmby Hills, Los Angeles